Casa del Telegrafista (house of the telegrapher) is a museum in Aracataca. The town is the birthplace of author Gabriel Garcia Marquez and photographer Leo Matiz. The museum is located to the north of the town.

References

Museums in Colombia